Muang Khon WU Football Club (Thai สโมสรฟุตบอลเมืองคอนดับบลิวยู), is a Thai amateur football club based in Nakhon Si Thammarat, Thailand. The club is currently playing in the Thai League 4.

Stadium and locations

Record

P = Played
W = Games won
D = Games drawn
L = Games lost
F = Goals for
A = Goals against
Pts = Points
Pos = Final position

QR1 = First Qualifying Round
QR2 = Second Qualifying Round
R1 = Round 1
R2 = Round 2
R3 = Round 3
R4 = Round 4

R5 = Round 5
R6 = Round 6
QF = Quarter-finals
SF = Semi-finals
RU = Runners-up
W = Winners

References
 104 ทีมร่วมชิงชัย! แบโผผลจับสลาก ดิวิชั่น 3 ฤดูกาล 2016
 Muangkhon United news
 https://www.youtube.com/watch?v=U5S4wuTALik
 https://pantip.com/topic/36869154

External links
 Facebook-page

Association football clubs established in 2016
Football clubs in Thailand
Nakhon Si Thammarat province
2016 establishments in Thailand